Catherine Anne Campbell (born 20 July 1963) is a New Zealand former cricketer who played as a right-arm off break bowler. She appeared in 9 Test matches and 85 One Day Internationals for New Zealand between 1988 and 2000. She stood in as captain in two ODIs at the 2000 World Cup, which were both won, and her final WODI appearance was in the final of the tournament. She played domestic cricket for Otago and Canterbury.

References

External links

1963 births
Living people
Cricketers from Christchurch
New Zealand women cricketers
New Zealand women Test cricketers
New Zealand women One Day International cricketers
New Zealand women's One Day International captains
New Zealand women cricket captains
Otago Sparks cricketers
Canterbury Magicians cricketers